S. John Shaw ( – 31 July 2010), also known by the nickname of "Joby", was an English World Cup winning professional rugby league footballer who played in the 1950s and 1960s.

Background
Joby Shaw was born in Crofton, West Riding of Yorkshire, England, and he died aged 76 in Wakefield, West Yorkshire, England.

Playing career

International honours
Joby Shaw won caps for Great Britain while at Halifax in the 1960 Rugby League World Cup against France, and Australia, in 1960 against France, in 1961 against France, and in 1962 against New Zealand.

County honours
Joby Shaw was selected for Yorkshire County XIII whilst at Wakefield Trinity during the 1958/59 season.

County Cup Final appearances
Joby Shaw played  in Wakefield Trinity's 20-24 defeat by Leeds in the 1958–59 Yorkshire County Cup Final during the 1958–59 season at Odsal Stadium, Bradford on Saturday 18 October 1958, and played  in Halifax's 10–0 victory over Featherstone Rovers in the 1963–64 Yorkshire County Cup Final during the 1963–64 season at Belle Vue, Wakefield on Saturday 2 November 1963.

Notable tour matches
Joby Shaw played , and was sent off, in Wakefield Trinity’s 17–12 victory over Australia in the 1956–57 Kangaroo tour of Great Britain and France match at Belle Vue, Wakefield on Monday 10 December 1956.

References

External links
!Great Britain Statistics at englandrl.co.uk (statistics currently missing due to not having appeared for both Great Britain, and England)
Statistics at rugbyleagueproject.org
Cup-winning rugby hero dies
Wakefield Trinity legend dies aged 76
Ex-Halifax rugby star dies at 76

1934 births
2010 deaths
English rugby league players
Great Britain national rugby league team players
Halifax R.L.F.C. players
People from Crofton, West Yorkshire
Rugby league players from Wakefield
Rugby league hookers
Wakefield Trinity players
Yorkshire rugby league team players